Pacific Southwest Airlines (PSA) Flight 182 was a scheduled flight of Pacific Southwest Airlines from Sacramento to Los Angeles and San Diego. On September 25, 1978, the Boeing 727-214 serving the flight, registration N533PS, collided with a private Cessna 172 light aircraft, registration N7711G, over San Diego, California. It was Pacific Southwest Airlines' first fatal accident, and it remains the deadliest air disaster in California history. At the time, it was the deadliest air crash in American history, and would remain so until American Airlines Flight 191 in May 1979.

Both aircraft crashed into North Park, a San Diego neighborhood. PSA 182 struck just north of the intersection of Dwight and Nile streets, killing all 135 people aboard the aircraft and seven people on the ground in houses, including two children. The Cessna struck Polk Avenue between 32nd and Iowa streets, killing the two on board. Nine others on the ground were injured and twenty-two residences were destroyed or damaged by the impact and debris.

Crash

On the morning of September 25, 1978, Pacific Southwest Airlines Flight 182 departed Sacramento for San Diego via Los Angeles. The seven-person, San Diego-based crew consisted of Captain James E. "Jim" McFeron (42); First Officer Robert E. "Bob" Fox (38); Flight Engineer Martin J. Wahne (44); and four flight attendants. The flight from Sacramento to Los Angeles was uneventful. At 8:34 am, Flight 182 departed Los Angeles. First Officer Fox was the pilot flying. There were 128 passengers on board including 29 PSA employees.

At 8:59 am, the PSA crew was alerted by the approach controller about a small Cessna 172 Skyhawk aircraft nearby. The Cessna was being flown by two licensed pilots. One was Martin Kazy Jr., 32, who possessed single-engine, multiengine, and instrument flight ratings, as well as a commercial certificate and an instrument flight instructor certificate. He had flown a total of 5,137 hours. The other, David Boswell, 35, a U.S. Marine Corps sergeant, possessed single-engine and multiengine ratings and a commercial certificate. He had flown 407 hours at the time of the accident, and was practicing instrument landing system approaches under the instruction of Kazy in pursuit of his instrument rating. They had departed from Montgomery Field and were navigating under visual flight rules, which did not require the filing of a flight plan. Boswell was wearing a "hood" to limit his field of vision straight ahead to the cockpit panel, much like an oversized sun visor with vertical panels to block peripheral vision, which is normal in IFR training. At the time of the collision, the Cessna was on the missed approach (in visual meteorological conditions) from San Diego airport's (also known as Lindbergh Field) Runway 9, heading east and climbing. The Cessna was in communication with San Diego approach control.

The PSA pilots reported that they saw the Cessna after being notified of its position by ATC, although cockpit voice recordings revealed that shortly thereafter, the PSA pilots no longer had the Cessna in sight and they were speculating about its position. Due to radio static, Lindbergh tower (as per the tower voice recording) received the 09.00:50 transmission as "He's passing off to our right" and assumed the PSA jet had the Cessna in sight, thus maintaining visual separation.

After getting permission to land, and about 40 seconds before colliding with the Cessna, the conversation among the four occupants of the cockpit (captain, first officer, flight engineer, and the off-duty PSA captain, Spencer Nelson, who was riding in the cockpit's jump seat) was, as follows, showing the confusion:

Despite the captain's comment that the Cessna was "probably behind us now," it was actually directly in front of and below the Boeing. The PSA plane was descending and rapidly closing in on the small plane, which had taken a right turn to the east, deviating from the assigned course. According to the report issued by the National Transportation Safety Board (NTSB), the Cessna may have been a difficult visual target for the jet's pilots, as it was below them and blended in with the multicolored houses of the residential area beneath; the Cessna's fuselage was yellow, and most of the houses were a yellowish color. Also, the apparent motion of the Cessna as viewed from the Boeing was minimized, as the planes were on approximately the same course. The report said that another possible reason that the PSA aircrew had difficulty observing the Cessna was that its fuselage was made visually smaller due to foreshortening. However, the same report in another section also stated, "the white surface of the Cessna's wing could have presented a relatively bright target in the morning sunlight."

A visibility study cited in the NTSB report concluded that the Cessna should have been almost centered in the windshield of the Boeing from 170 to 90 seconds before the collision, and thereafter it was probably positioned on the lower portion of the windshield just above the windshield wipers. The study also said that the Cessna pilot would have had about a 10-second view of the Boeing from the left-door window about 90 seconds before the collision, but visibility of the overtaking jet was blocked by the Cessna's ceiling structure for the remainder of the time.

Flight 182's crew never explicitly alerted the tower that they had lost sight of the Cessna; if they had made this clear to controllers, the crash might not have happened. Also, if the Cessna had maintained the heading of 70° assigned to it by ATC instead of turning to 90°, the NTSB estimates the planes would have missed each other by about  instead of colliding. Ultimately, the NTSB maintained that, regardless of that change in course, it was the responsibility of the crew in the overtaking jet to comply with the regulatory requirement to pass "well clear" of the Cessna.

Approach control on the ground picked up an automated conflict alert 19 seconds before the collision, but did not relay this information to the aircraft because, according to the approach coordinator, such alerts were commonplace even when no actual conflict existed. The NTSB stated: "Based on all information available to him, he decided that the crew of Flight 182 were complying with their visual separation clearance; that they were accomplishing an overtake maneuver within the separation parameters of the conflict alert computer; and that, therefore, no conflict existed."

This was the conversation in the PSA cockpit starting 16 seconds before collision with the Cessna:

PSA Flight 182 overtook the Cessna, which was directly below it, both roughly on a 090 (due east) heading. According to several witnesses on the ground, first, they heard a loud metallic "crunching" sound, then an explosion, and a fire drew them to look up.

Staff photographer Hans Wendt of the San Diego County Public Relations Office was attending an outdoor press event with a still camera and took two postcollision photographs of the falling 727, its right wing burning. Cameraman Steve Howell from local TV channel 39 was attending the same event and captured the Cessna on film as it fell toward Earth, the sound of the impacting 727, and the mushroom cloud from the resulting crash. For its coverage of the disaster, The San Diego Evening Tribune, a predecessor to The San Diego Union-Tribune, was awarded a Pulitzer Prize in 1979 for "Local, General, or Spot News Reporting".

PSA 182's right wing was heavily damaged, rendering the plane uncontrollable and sending it careening into a sharp right bank (seen in the Wendt photos), and the fuel tank inside it ruptured and started a fire, when this final conversation took place inside the cockpit:

Seismographic readings indicated that the impact occurred at 09:02:07, about 2.5 seconds after the cockpit voice recorder lost power. One of the plane's wings lodged in a house. The coordinates for the Boeing crash site are in the infobox. The largest piece of the Cessna impacted about six blocks away near 32nd Street and Polk Avenue .

The explosion and fire from the 727 crash created a mushroom cloud that could be seen for miles (and was photographed and filmed). About 60% of the entire San Diego Fire Department was ultimately dispatched to the scene. The severity of the crash meant the engines, tail section, and landing gear were among the few recognizable parts remaining of the destroyed 727. However, the impact and debris area was relatively small due to the plane's steep, nose-down angle.

In total, 144 people died in the crash, including Flight 182's seven crew members, 30 additional PSA employees deadheading to PSA's San Diego base, the two Cessna occupants, and seven residents (five women, two male children) on the ground. With 144 deaths, it was the deadliest accident to occur in the United States, surpassing the 1960 New York mid-air collision's 134 fatalities, until eight months later when American Airlines Flight 191 crashed with 273 deaths. As of 2021, it is the sixth-deadliest aviation disaster in the United States (not including terrorism), as well as the deadliest aviation disaster in California.

Investigation
At the nearby St. Augustine High School, a triage and command and control center was established, with its gymnasium being used as a makeshift morgue and for forensic investigation.  Freezer units were used to preserve the biological remains, as San Diego was in the middle of a severe heat wave, with temperatures exceeding .

National Transportation Safety Board report number NTSB/AAR-79-05, released April 19, 1979, determined that the probable cause of the accident was the failure of the PSA flight crew to follow proper air traffic control (ATC) procedures. Flight 182's crew lost sight of the Cessna in contravention of ATC instructions to "keep visual separation from that traffic", and did not alert ATC that they had lost sight of it. Errors on the part of ATC were also named as contributing factors, including the use of visual separation procedures when radar clearances were available. Additionally, the Cessna pilots, for reasons unknown, did not maintain their assigned east-northeasterly heading of 070° after completing a practice instrument approach, nor did they notify ATC of their course change. Concerning this, the NTSB report states, "According to the testimony of the controllers and the assistant chief flight instructor of the Gibbs Flite Center (owner of the Cessna), the 08:59:56 transmission from approach control to the Cessna only imposed an altitude limitation on the pilot, he was not required to maintain the 070° heading. However, the assistant chief flight instructor testified that he would expect the [Cessna] pilot to fly the assigned heading or inform the controller that he was not able to do so."

A dissenting opinion in the original (more at bottom of paragraph) NTSB crash report by member Francis H. McAdams strongly questioned why the unauthorized change in course by the Cessna was not specifically cited as a "contributing factor" in the final report; instead, it was listed as simply a "finding", which carries less weight. McAdams also "sharply disagreed" with the majority of the panel on other issues, giving more weight to inadequate ATC procedures as another "probable cause" to the accident, rather than merely treating them as a contributing factor. McAdams also added the "possible misidentification of the Cessna by the PSA aircrew due to the presence of a third unknown aircraft in the area" as a contributing factor. The majority panel members did not cite this as a credible possibility. In an August 1982 amendment to the probable-cause finding, the NTSB adopted McAdams' viewpoints regarding both ATC and pilot failings.

The report states that in the PSA cockpit, some conversation in the cockpit was not relevant to the flight during critical phases of the flight. The report states that the conversation was not a causal factor in the accident, but that "it does point out the dangers inherent in this type of cockpit environment during descent and approach to landing."

The two photographs of Flight 182 taken by Hans Wendt revealed that the left wing flaps were extended as the crew tried to steer the crippled aircraft and that the right wing had a large piece missing where the Cessna had struck. Although it was obvious that the flaps were damaged or destroyed by the collision, NTSB investigators could not determine the condition of the hydraulic system in the wing and whether the plumbing inside it had actually been ruptured or merely flattened. Since the right wing was extremely fragmented, examination of debris provided no useful information. The crew may have tried to guide the 727 away from impacting a residential area and onto Route 805 where damage would be lessened, but could not do so. The final conclusion of the NTSB was that even if the hydraulic lines in the right wing were undamaged, the missing flaps and spreading fire would have adversely affected the plane's aerodynamic profile, and in all likelihood Flight 182 was completely uncontrollable after the collision.

Aftermath
In the aftermath of the devastation on the ground, a controversy was renewed in San Diego over the placement of such a busy airport in a heavily populated area. Despite proposals to relocate it, San Diego International Airport, the busiest single-runway commercial airport in the U.S., remains in use at the same site. The crash site was cordoned off by police and remained so for an entire year.

At the time, PSA Flight 182 was the U.S.'s deadliest commercial air disaster, surpassed eight months later on Friday, May 25, 1979, when American Airlines Flight 191 (a McDonnell Douglas DC-10) crashed in Chicago.

As a result of the crash, the NTSB recommended the immediate implementation of a Terminal Radar Service Area around Lindbergh Field to provide for the separation of aircraft, as well as an immediate review of control procedures for all busy terminal areas. This initial rule did not include small, general-aviation aircraft. Therefore, on May 15, 1980, the Federal Aviation Administration, implemented what is called Class B airspace to provide for the separation of all aircraft operating in the area. Additionally, all aircraft, regardless of size, are required to operate under "positive radar control", a rule that allows only radar control from the ground for all aircraft operating in the airport's airspace.

At the time of the crash, Lindbergh Field was the only airport in San Diego County with an instrument landing system. Since the Cessna pilot was practicing instrument landings, the FAA quickly installed the system at Montgomery Field and McClellan-Palomar Airport, as well as a localizer approach to Gillespie Field, to allow pilots to practice at smaller airports.

As a result of this and other midair collisions (including an almost identical one in 1986) the "Traffic Collision Alert and Avoidance System" (TCAS) is now installed in all commercial passenger aircraft and in most commercial cargo airplanes. TCAS gives the pilots visual and audible warnings in the cockpit when two aircraft are approaching each other, and directs pilots to either climb or descend to avoid the other aircraft. However, the system only works if at least one aircraft is equipped with TCAS and the other with a transponder. After the 1986 Cerritos collision, all flights in Class B were required to have a Mode C transponder. The International Civil Aviation Organization does not require TCAS on the type of small, single-engined planes that were involved in the PSA disaster or the one involving AeroMexico.

Because the PSA 182/Cessna collision was the result of pilot error, it is used as a teaching aid in modern flight training. Embry-Riddle Aeronautical University uses the crash in "human factors" classes, while others refer to it when teaching airspace or visual separation rules.

Don St. Germain, who was an employee with PSA, was working aboard this flight when he died with the other 143 passengers and crew. Nine years later, his brother-in-law Douglas Arthur, who was a PSA pilot, was killed aboard PSA Flight 1771 near Cayucos, California along with 42 other passengers and crew by a recently-fired employee named David Augustus Burke. Burke shot his former boss, a flight attendant, the two pilots, and Arthur before he sent the plane into a nosedive, causing the aircraft to crash at the speed of sound. As such, Nikki St. Germain lost her brother in the first-ever deadly crash of a PSA flight, and her husband in the second. Those were the only two deadly crashes in the 40 year history of the airline.

Memorials

A memorial plaque honoring those who died on both planes and on the ground is located in the San Diego Aerospace Museum, near the Theodore Gildred Flight Rotunda in San Diego's Balboa Park. On the 20th anniversary of the crash, a tree was planted next to the North Park branch library, and a memorial plaque was dedicated to those who lost their lives. The library is not in the immediate vicinity of the actual crash site; it has been rebuilt and bears no visible evidence of the crash. 

On September 25, 2008, over 100 relatives and friends of the victims of PSA 182 gathered at Dwight and Nile Streets in North Park for a 30th-anniversary memorial of the crash.

Depictions in media
The ATC recording of the accident, as well as graphic footage of the aftermath, was included in the mondo film Faces of Death, released two months after the crash.

The accident was covered in season 11 of the documentary TV series Mayday in an episode titled "Blind Spot". The episode featured interviews from witnesses and accident investigators and recreations of the crash. This episode aired on the Smithsonian Channel as Air Disasters season three, episode one.

The accident was covered in MSNBC's Why Planes Crash in the episode "Collision Course", first aired April 27, 2010.

Years later Whoopi Goldberg, who had witnessed the collision, referenced it as to why she stopped traveling by air.

See also
List of notable midair collisions
List of accidents and incidents involving commercial aircraft

Notes

References

External links

Article about Flight 182 – Pacific Southwest Airlines
PSA Flight 182 & 1771 Memorial Page at The PSA History Museum
San Diego magazine 20th anniversary article about the PSA Disaster - Archived copy from Wayback Machine
"Death Over San Diego", Time Magazine, October 9, 1978
36th anniversary of Flight 182 North Park crash – KGTV
PSA Crash Page with map
Pre-crash photos of 727 N533PS
Audio of communications between ATC and PSA Flight 182 - WAV file
Air Tragedy Remembered Union Tribune Article about 30th anniversary tribute
"Return to Dwight and Nile: The Crash of PSA 182" A 2009 documentary with eyewitness interviews

Accidents and incidents involving the Boeing 727
Airliner accidents and incidents caused by pilot error
Airliner accidents and incidents in California
Mid-air collisions
Mid-air collisions involving airliners
Mid-air collisions involving general aviation aircraft
Aviation accidents and incidents caused by air traffic controller error
Flight 182
San Diego International Airport
1970s in San Diego
1978 in California
Aviation accidents and incidents in the United States in 1978
September 1978 events in the United States